The Andy Williams Show was an American television variety show that ran from 1962 to 1971 (alternating during the summer of 1970 with Andy Williams Presents Ray Stevens)    and had a short-lived run in syndication beginning in the fall of 1976. It was hosted by singer Andy Williams.

The program 

The Andy Williams Show featured a number of regular performers including:  
 Dick Van Dyke (1958)
 The New Christy Minstrels (1962-1962)
 The Osmond Brothers (1962-1971) 
 Jonathan Winters (1965-1967, 1970-1971)
 The Good Time Singers (1963-1966)
 Professor Irwin Corey (1969-1970)
 Ray Stevens (1969-1971)
 The Lennon Sisters (1970-1971)
 Charlie Callas (1970-1971)
 Janos Prohaska (The Cookie Bear) (1969-1971)

The first series began as a summer replacement on CBS in 1959. The weekly year-round series premiered on NBC in 1962, where it ran until 1967, when William reduced his workload to three specials a year. He returned to having a weekly series from 1969 through 1971.  

During the fall of 1963, the show aired every two weeks, rather than weekly, alternating with the television version of The Bell Telephone Hour.

When the show debuted, it was tailored to Williams's pop music stylings and aimed at adult viewers. Although generally categorized as a musical variety show, it was also popular in part for its comedy skits. During its five-year run on NBC, the show drew respectable ratings, although it never made the list of top-thirty programs.

In 1967, Williams decided to cut back to three specials per year. However, two years later he returned to weekly television in a revised format that included rock and roll acts and psychedelic lighting.

Five years after his second weekly run at NBC had ended, Williams tried his hand at a half-hour weekly variety show, this time in syndication. But it lasted only one season (1976–1977).

Awards and nominations

List of guest stars

A
Don Adams
Anna Maria Alberghetti
Steve Allen
Woody Allen
Herb Alpert & the Tijuana Brass
Nancy Ames
Morey Amsterdam
Julie Andrews
Desi Arnaz
Eddy Arnold
Cliff Arquette
The Association
John Astin

B
Burt Bacharach
Pearl Bailey
Barbara Bain
Carl Ballantine
Tallulah Bankhead
Gene Barry
Count Basie
Shirley Bassey
The Beach Boys
The Bee Gees
Tony Bennett
Jack Benny
Edgar Bergen
Polly Bergen
Milton Berle
Shelley Berman
Ken Berry
Joey Bishop
Dan Blocker
Blood, Sweat & Tears
Pat Boone
Shirley Booth
Victor Borge
Ernest Borgnine
Bread
Mel Brooks
Raymond Burr
Red Buttons

C
Sid Caesar
Charlie Callas
Judy Carne
Art Carney
The Carpenters
Johnny Cash
Dorival Caymmi
Chad & Jeremy
George Chakiris
Richard Chamberlain
Carol Channing
Ray Charles
Chubby Checker
Petula Clark
Rosemary Clooney
Imogene Coca
Judy Collins
Irwin Corey
Bill Cosby
Wally Cox
Creedence Clearwater Revival
Bing Crosby
Pat Crowley

D
Vic Damone
Billy Daniels
Bobby Darin
Bette Davis
Sammy Davis Jr.
Jimmy Dean
Jackie DeShannon
The Diamonds
Phyllis Diller
Donovan
Mike Douglas
Jimmy Durante

E
Buddy Ebsen
Barbara Eden
Vince Edwards
Cass Elliot
Dale Evans

F
Nanette Fabray
Jose Feliciano
The 5th Dimension
Eddie Fisher
Ella Fitzgerald
Tennessee Ernie Ford
Redd Foxx
Pete Fountain
Connie Francis
Aretha Franklin

G
Judy Garland
Erroll Garner
James Garner
Bobbie Gentry
George Gobel
Lesley Gore
Eydie Gormé
Frank Gorshin
Robert Goulet
Betty Grable
The Grass Roots
Buddy Greco
Lorne Greene
Rosey Grier
Andy Griffith
Tammy Grimes

H
Buddy Hackett
Bill Haley & His Comets
Phil Harris
Noel Harrison
Edwin Hawkins Singers
Bill Hayes
Joey Heatherton
Al Hirt
Don Ho
Bob Hope
Mary Hopkin
Lena Horne
Thelma Houston
Ross Hunter

I
Burl Ives

J
The Jackson 5
Sam Jaffe
Antonio Carlos Jobim
Elton John
Arte Johnson
Davy Jones
Jack Jones
Shirley Jones

K
Danny Kaye
Bob Keeshan
Morgana King
The Kingston Trio
Gladys Knight & the Pips
Don Knotts

L
Martin Landau
Peter Lawford
Steve Lawrence
Peggy Lee
Janet Leigh
The Lennon Sisters
The Lettermen
Herschell Gordon Lewis
Jerry Lewis
Jerry Lee Lewis
Liberace
Peggy Lipton
Little Richard
Claudine Longet
Trini Lopez
Deanna Lund
Paul Lynde

M
Fred MacMurray
Henry Mancini
Johnny Mathis
David McCallum
Roddy McDowall
Vaughn Meader
Sergio Mendes & Brasil '66
Marian Mercer
Roger Miller
Hayley Mills
Mary Tyler Moore
Rita Moreno
Robert Morse

N
Harriet Nelson
Ozzie Nelson
The New Christy Minstrels
Bob Newhart
Anthony Newley
Red Norvo
Louis Nye

O
Donald O'Connor
Maureen O'Hara
The Osmonds
Marie Osmond

P
Fess Parker
Peter, Paul & Mary
Channing Pollock
Jane Powell
André Previn
Juliet Prowse
Gary Puckett & The Union Gap
Perry Como

Q

R
The Rascals
Johnnie Ray
Martha Raye
Carl Reiner
Lee Remick
Debbie Reynolds
The Righteous Brothers
Smokey Robinson & The Miracles
Jimmie Rodgers
Kenny Rogers & The First Edition
Roy Rogers
Linda Ronstadt
Mickey Rooney
Rowan & Martin
Irene Ryan

S
Jill St. John
Buffy Sainte-Marie
Sandler and Young
Mongo Santamaría
Rod Serling
Dick Shawn
Allan Sherman
Bobby Sherman
Herb Shriner
Simon & Garfunkel
Sly and the Family Stone
Nancy Sinatra
Kate Smith
Keely Smith
The Smothers Brothers
Elke Sommer
Sonny & Cher
Ann Sothern
Dusty Springfield
Inger Stevens
Ray Stevens
Larry Storch
The Supremes

T
Terry-Thomas
Danny Thomas
The Temptations
Tiny Tim
Ike & Tina Turner

U
Leslie Uggams
Miyoshi Umeki

V
Dick Van Dyke
Jerry Van Dyke

W
Nancy Walker
Lawrence Welk
Señor Wences
Tony Joe White
Roger Williams
Flip Wilson
Nancy Wilson
Jonathan Winters
Jo Anne Worley
Jane Wyman

X

Y
Alan Young
Gig Young

Z

References

External links

1959 American television series debuts
1959 American television series endings
1962 American television series debuts
1971 American television series endings
CBS original programming
NBC original programming
1950s American music television series
1960s American music television series
1970s American music television series
1950s American variety television series
1960s American variety television series
1970s American variety television series
Primetime Emmy Award for Outstanding Variety Series winners
English-language television shows
American television series revived after cancellation